The Boal surname is a variant of Bowell and Boyle. It is common in people of English, Welsh, and Irish descent. In Ireland it is a variant of Boyle while in northern Ireland it developed from the name Bowell.

Notable people with the surname include:

Augusto Boal (1931-2009), Brazilian theater director
Carmine Boal (born 1956), American politician
Desmond Boal (born 1929 ), Northern Ireland politician and barrister
Don Boal (1907–1953), Canadian rower
Iain Boal, Irish social historian
James McClellan Boal, American politician
Mark Boal (born 1973), American journalist, screenwriter and film producer
Peter Boal (born 1965), American balletmaster and former New York City Ballet principal
Robert Boal (1806–1903), American politician and physician
Theodore Davis Boal (1867–1938), American army veteran (Colonel) and architect
Walter Boal (born c. 1879), All-American football player and hammer thrower
William Boal (died 1970), imprisoned for association with Mail Train robbery in 1963

See also
Boal, Spanish municipality in Asturias
Boal (disambiguation)

References

External links
The Boal Surname in the United States
Boal Family Genealogy Forum
Boal Mansion Museum
Genealogical mailing list

Surnames